John Isaiah Brauman (born September 7, 1937) is an American chemist.

Biography
John Brauman was born in Pittsburgh on September 7, 1937. Brauman graduated from Taylor Allderdice High School in 1955. He obtained a bachelor's degree in 1959 from Massachusetts Institute of Technology and a Ph.D. from University of California at Berkeley in 1963. He is married to Sharon K Brauman, also a chemist. Their daughter, Kate Brauman is the lead scientist for the Global Water Initiative at the University of Minnesota's Institute on the Environment.

On October 29, 2003 George W. Bush awarded the National Medal of Science to John Brauman, who at that time was the J.G. Jackson and C.J. Wood Professor of Chemistry at Stanford University. His research there concerns how molecules react and the factors that determine the rates and products of chemical reactions. The main areas of research involve the spectroscopy, photochemistry, reaction dynamics, and reaction mechanisms of ions in the gas phase.

Awards and honors
1973 ACS Award in pure chemistry
1976 Harrison Howe Award, and awards from American Academy of Arts and Sciences, National Academy of Sciences, and Dean's Award for distinguished teaching
1978-1979 He was a Guggenheim fellow 
1986 ACS Arthur C. Cope Scholar Award
1986 ACS James Flack Norris Award in Physical Organic Chemistry
1986 R.C. Fuson Award
1991 He became an honorary fellow of California Academy of Sciences
2001 Awarded the National Academy of Sciences Award in chemical sciences. 
2002 Awarded the National Medal of Science and the Linus Pauling Award. 
2003 Willard Gibbs Award.
 2017, Charles Lathrop Parsons Award for Public Service, American Chemical Society

Works
Examples of Professor Brauman's publications include:

References

External links
John Isaiah Brauman
Interviews with John Brauman

20th-century American chemists
1937 births
Living people
People associated with the California Academy of Sciences
University of California, Berkeley alumni
Scientists from the San Francisco Bay Area